Running wheel may refer to:

 Alternative name for a carrying wheel on a steam locomotive
 Hamster wheel